Fishenden is a surname. Notable people with the surname include:

Jerry Fishenden, English futurologist
Paul Fishenden (born 1963), English footballer